Skysouth was a passenger airline based in Shoreham-by-Sea, England.  Founded in 2006, Skysouth began operations to France in June 2006.  They served three destinations in France from their base at Shoreham Airport with at least 22 weekly flights.  The airline ceased operations in February 2009, citing, in their website announcement, "unprecedented economic conditions" which made their operation no longer financially viable.

Destinations
Skysouth served three destinations in France from the United Kingdom (at 4 January 2009):

Caen (Caen - Carpiquet Airport)
Deauville (Deauville - Saint-Gatien Airport)
Le Touquet (Le Touquet - Côte d'Opale Airport)

Shoreham-by-Sea (Shoreham Airport) Hub

Fleet

The Skysouth fleet consisted of one aircraft (at 4 January 2009):

See also
 List of defunct airlines of the United Kingdom

References

External links
Official website with end-of-operations notice.

Airlines established in 2006
Airlines disestablished in 2009
Defunct airlines of the United Kingdom